Tail Island is a circular island  in diameter and 130 m high, lying midway between Egg Island and Eagle Island in the northeast part of Prince Gustav Channel. Islands in this area were first seen by a party under J. Gunnar Andersson of the Swedish Antarctic Expedition, 1901–04. Tail Island was charted by the Falkland Islands Dependencies Survey (FIDS) in 1945, and so named by them because of its relative position to Eagle and Beak islands.

See also 
 List of Antarctic and sub-Antarctic islands

Islands of Trinity Peninsula